The Battle of Austerlitz (2 December 1805/11 Frimaire An XIV FRC), also known as the Battle of the Three Emperors, was one of the most important and decisive engagements of the Napoleonic Wars. The battle occurred near the town of Austerlitz in the Austrian Empire (modern-day Slavkov u Brna in the Czech Republic). The decisive victory of Napoleon's Grande Armée at Austerlitz brought the War of the Third Coalition to a rapid end, with the Treaty of Pressburg signed by the Austrians later in the month. The battle is often cited as a tactical masterpiece, in the same league as other historic engagements like Cannae or Gaugamela.

After eliminating an Austrian army during the Ulm Campaign, French forces seized Vienna in November 1805. The Austrians avoided further conflict until the arrival of the Russians bolstered Allied numbers. Napoleon sent his army north in pursuit of the Allies, but then ordered his forces to retreat so he could feign a grave weakness. Desperate to lure the Allies into battle, Napoleon gave every indication in the days preceding the engagement that the French army was in a pitiful state, even abandoning the dominant Pratzen Heights near Austerlitz. He deployed the French army below the Pratzen Heights and deliberately weakened his right flank, enticing the Allies to launch a major assault there in the hopes of rolling up the whole French line. A forced march from Vienna by Marshal Davout and his III Corps plugged the gap left by Napoleon just in time. Meanwhile, the heavy Allied deployment against the French right weakened the allied center on the Pratzen Heights, which was viciously attacked by the IV Corps of Marshal Soult. With the Allied center demolished, the French swept through both enemy flanks and sent the Allies fleeing chaotically, capturing thousands of prisoners in the process.

The Allied disaster significantly shook the faith of Emperor Francis II in the British-led war effort. France and Austria agreed to an armistice immediately and the Treaty of Pressburg followed shortly after, on 26 December. Pressburg took Austria out of both the war and the Coalition while reinforcing the earlier treaties of Campo Formio and of Lunéville between the two powers. The treaty confirmed the Austrian loss of lands in Italy and Bavaria to France, and in Germany to Napoleon's German allies. It also imposed an indemnity of 40 million francs on the defeated Habsburgs and allowed the fleeing Russian troops free passage through hostile territories and back to their home soil. Critically, victory at Austerlitz permitted the creation of the Confederation of the Rhine, a collection of German states intended as a buffer zone between France and Central Europe. The Confederation rendered the Holy Roman Empire virtually useless, so the latter collapsed in 1806 after Francis abdicated the imperial throne. These achievements, however, did not establish a lasting peace on the continent. Prussian worries about growing French influence in Central Europe sparked the War of the Fourth Coalition in 1806.

Prologue

Europe had been in turmoil since the start of the French Revolutionary Wars in 1792. In 1797, after five years of war, the French Republic subdued the First Coalition, an alliance of Austria, Prussia, Great Britain, Spain, and various Italian states. A Second Coalition, led by Britain, Austria and Russia, and including the Ottoman Empire, Portugal and Naples, was formed in 1798, but by 1801, this too had been defeated, leaving Britain the only opponent of the new French Consulate. In March 1802, France and Britain agreed to end hostilities under the Treaty of Amiens.

But many problems persisted between the two sides, making implementation of the treaty increasingly difficult. The British government resented having to return the Cape Colony and most of the Dutch West Indian islands to the Batavian Republic. Napoleon was angry that British troops had not evacuated the island of Malta. The tense situation only worsened when Napoleon sent an expeditionary force to crush the Haitian Revolution. In May 1803, Britain declared war on France.

Third Coalition

In December 1804, an Anglo-Swedish agreement led to the creation of the Third Coalition. British Prime Minister William Pitt spent 1804 and 1805 in a flurry of diplomatic activity geared towards forming a new coalition against France, and by April 1805, Britain and Russia had signed an alliance. Having been defeated twice in recent memory by France, and being keen on revenge, Austria joined the coalition a few months later.

Forces

French Imperial army
Before the formation of the Third Coalition, Napoleon had assembled an invasion force, called the Armée d'Angleterre (Army of England) around six camps at Boulogne in Northern France. He intended to use this force, amounting to 150,000 men, to strike at England, and was so confident of success that he had commemorative medals struck to celebrate the conquest of the English. Although they never invaded, Napoleon's troops received careful and invaluable training for any possible military operation. Boredom among the troops occasionally set in, but Napoleon paid many visits and conducted lavish parades in order to boost morale.

The men at Boulogne formed the core for what Napoleon would later call La Grande Armée. The army was organized into seven corps, which were large field units that contained 36 to 40 cannons each and were capable of independent action until other corps could come to the rescue. A single corps (properly situated in a strong defensive position) could survive at least a day without support. In addition to these forces, Napoleon created a cavalry reserve of 22,000 organized into two cuirassier divisions, four mounted dragoon divisions, one division of dismounted dragoons and one of light cavalry, all supported by 24 artillery pieces. By 1805, the Grande Armée had grown to a force of 350,000 men, who were well equipped, well trained, and led by competent officers.

Russian Imperial army

The Russian army in 1805 had many characteristics of Ancien Régime organization. There was no permanent formation above the regimental level, and senior officers were mostly recruited from aristocratic circles; commissions were generally given to the highest bidder, regardless of competence. Nonetheless, the Russian infantry was considered one of the hardiest in Europe, with fine artillery manned by experienced professional soldiers.

Austrian Imperial army

Charles was Austria's most able field commander, but he was unpopular at court and lost much influence when, against his advice, Austria decided to go to war with France. Karl Mack became the new main commander in Austria's army, instituting reforms on the eve of the war that called for a regiment to be composed of four battalions of four companies, rather than three battalions of six companies.

Preliminary moves

In August 1805, Napoleon, Emperor of the French since December of the previous year, turned his sights from the English Channel to the Rhine to deal with the new Austrian and Russian threats. Mack had gathered the greater part of the Austrian army at the fortress of Ulm in Swabia.

Napoleon swung his forces southward in a wheeling movement that put the French at the Austrian rear, while cavalry attacks were launched through the Black Forest, keeping the Austrians at bay. The Ulm Maneuver was well-executed and on 20 October, 23,000 Austrian troops surrendered at Ulm, bringing the number of Austrian prisoners of the campaign to 60,000. Although this spectacular victory was soured by the defeat of the Franco-Spanish fleet at the Battle of Trafalgar the following day, French success on land continued as Vienna fell in November. The French gained 100,000 muskets, 500 cannons, and intact bridges across the Danube.

Russian delays prevented them from saving the Austrian armies; the Russians then withdrew to the northeast, to await reinforcements and link up with surviving Austrian units. Tsar Alexander I appointed general Mikhail Illarionovich Kutuzov commander-in-chief of the combined Russo-Austrian force. On 9 September 1805, Kutuzov arrived at the battlefield, quickly contacting Francis I of Austria and his courtiers to discuss strategy and logistics. Under pressure from Kutuzov, the Austrians agreed to supply munitions and weapons in a timely manner. Kutuzov also spotted shortcomings in the Austrian defense plan, which he called "very dogmatic". He objected to Austrian annexation of the land recently under Napoleon's control, because this would make the local people distrust the allied force.

The French followed after Kutuzov, but soon found themselves in a difficult position. Prussian intentions were unknown and could be hostile, the Russian and Austrian armies had converged, and French lines of communication were extremely long, requiring strong garrisons to keep them open. Napoleon realized that to capitalize on the success at Ulm, he had to force the Allies to battle and defeat them.

On the Russian side, Kutuzov also realized Napoleon needed to do battle; so instead of clinging to the "suicidal" Austrian defense plan, Kutuzov decided to retreat. He ordered Pyotr Bagration to contain the French at Vienna with 600 soldiers, and instructed Bagration to accept Murat's ceasefire proposal so that the Allied Army could have more time to retreat. It was later discovered that the proposal was false and had been used in order to launch a surprise attack on Vienna. Nonetheless, Bagration was able to hold off the French assault for a time by negotiating an armistice with Murat, thereby providing Kutuzov time to position himself with the Russian rearguard near Hollabrunn.

Murat initially refrained from an attack, believing the entire Russian army stood before him. Napoleon soon realized Murat's mistakes and ordered him to pursue quickly; but the allied army had already retreated to Olmütz. According to Kutuzov's plan, the Allies would retreat further to the Carpathian region and "at Galicia, I will bury the French."

Napoleon did not stay still. The French Emperor decided to set a psychological trap in order to lure the Allies out. Days before any fighting, Napoleon had been giving the impression that his army was weak and that he desired a negotiated peace. About 53,000 French troops—including Soult, Lannes and Murat's forces—were assigned to take Austerlitz and the Olmütz road, occupying the enemy's attention. The Allied forces, numbering about 89,000, seemed far superior and would be tempted to attack the outnumbered French army. However, the Allies did not know that Bernadotte, Mortier and Davout were already within the supported distance, and could be called in by forced marches: Bernadotte from Iglau, and Mortier and Davout from Vienna which would raise the French number to 75,000 troops.

Napoleon's lure did not stop at that. On 25 November, General Savary was sent to the Allied headquarters at Olmütz to deliver Napoleon's message expressing his desire to avoid a battle, while secretly examining the Allied forces' situation. As expected, the overture was seen as a sign of weakness. When Francis I offered an armistice on the 27th, Napoleon accepted enthusiastically. On the same day, Napoleon ordered Soult to abandon both Austerlitz and the Pratzen Heights and, while doing so, to create an impression of chaos during the retreat that would induce the enemy to occupy the Heights.

The next day (28 November), the French Emperor requested a personal interview with Alexander I and received a visit from the Tsar's most impetuous aide, Prince Peter Dolgorukov. The meeting was another part of the trap, as Napoleon intentionally expressed anxiety and hesitation to his opponents. Dolgorukov reported to the Tsar an additional indication of French weakness.

The plan was successful. Many of the Allied officers, including the Tsar's aides and the Austrian Chief of Staff Franz von Weyrother, strongly supported an immediate attack and appeared to sway Tsar Alexander. Kutuzov's plan to retreat further to the Carpathian region was rejected, and the Allied forces soon fell into Napoleon's trap.

Battle

The battle began with the French army outnumbered. Napoleon had some 72,000 men and 157 guns for the impending battle, with about 7,000 troops under Davout still far to the south in the direction of Vienna. The Allies had about 85,000 soldiers, seventy percent of them Russian, and 318 guns.

At first, Napoleon was not totally confident of victory. In a letter written to Minister of Foreign Affairs Talleyrand, Napoleon requested Talleyrand not tell anyone about the upcoming battle because he did not want to disturb Empress Joséphine. According to Frederick C. Schneid, the French Emperor's chief worry was how he could explain to Joséphine a French defeat.

Battlefield

The battle took place about six miles (ten kilometers) southeast of the city of Brno, between that city and Austerlitz in what is now the Czech Republic. The northern part of the battlefield was dominated by the 700-foot (210-meter) Santon Hill and the 880-foot (270-meter) Zuran (Žuráň) Hill, both overlooking the vital Olomouc/Brno road, which was on an east–west axis. To the west of these two hills was the village of Bellowitz (Bedřichovice), and between them the Bosenitz (Roketnice) stream went south to link up with the Goldbach (Říčka) stream, the latter flowing by the villages of Kobelnitz (Kobylnice), Sokolnitz (Sokolnice), and Telnitz (Telnice).

The centrepiece of the entire area was the Pratzen (Prace) Heights, a gently sloping hill about 35 to 40 feet (10 to 12 meters) in height. An aide noted that Napoleon repeatedly told his marshals, "Gentlemen, examine this ground carefully, it is going to be a battlefield; you will have a part to play upon it."

Allied plans and dispositions

The Allied council met on 1 December to discuss proposals for the battle. Most of the Allied strategists had two fundamental ideas in mind: making contact with the enemy and securing the southern flank that held the communication line to Vienna. Although the Tsar and his immediate entourage pushed hard for a battle, Emperor Francis of Austria was more cautious and, as mentioned, he was seconded by Kutuzov, the Commander-in-chief of the Russians and the Allied troops. The pressure to fight from the Russian nobles and the Austrian commanders, however, was too strong, and the Allies adopted the plan of the Austrian Chief-of-Staff, Franz von Weyrother. This called for a main drive against the French right flank, which the Allies noticed was lightly guarded, and diversionary attacks against the French left. The Allies deployed most of their troops into four columns that would attack the French right. The Russian Imperial Guard was held in reserve while Russian troops under Bagration guarded the Allied right. The Russian Tsar stripped Kutuzov of his authority as Commander-in-Chief and gave it to Franz von Weyrother. In the battle, Kutuzov could only command the IV Corps of the Allied army, although he was still the nominal commander because the Tsar was afraid to take over in case his favoured plan failed.

French plans and dispositions

Napoleon was hoping that the Allied forces would attack, and to encourage them, he deliberately weakened his right flank. On 28 November Napoleon met with his marshals at Imperial Headquarters, who informed him of their qualms about the forthcoming battle. He shrugged off their suggestion of retreat.

Napoleon's plan envisaged that the Allies would throw many troops to envelop his right flank in order to cut the French communication line from Vienna. As a result, the Allies' centre and left flank would be exposed and become vulnerable. To encourage them to do so, Napoleon abandoned the strategic position on the Pratzen Heights, faking the weakness of his forces and his own caution. Meanwhile, Napoleon's main force was to be concealed in a dead ground opposite the Heights. According to the plan, the French troops would attack and recapture the Pratzen Heights, then from the Heights they would launch a decisive assault to the center of the Allied army, cripple them, and encircle them from the rear.

The massive thrust through the Allied centre was conducted by 16,000 troops of Soult's IV Corps. IV Corps' position was cloaked by dense mist during the early stage of the battle; in fact, how long the mist lasted was vital to Napoleon's plan: Soult's troops would become uncovered if the mist dissipated too soon, but if it lingered too long, Napoleon would be unable to determine when the Allied troops had evacuated Pratzen Heights, preventing him from timing his attack properly.

Meanwhile, to support his weak right flank, Napoleon ordered Davout's III Corps to force march all the way from Vienna and join General Legrand's men, who held the extreme southern flank that would bear the heaviest part of the Allied attack. Davout's soldiers had 48 hours to march . Their arrival was crucial in determining the success of the French plan. Indeed, the arrangement of Napoleon on the right flank was very risky as the French had only minimal troops garrisoning there. However, Napoleon was able to use such a risky plan because Davout—the commander of III Corps—was one of Napoleon's best marshals, because the right flank's position was protected by a complicated system of streams and lakes, and because the French had already settled upon a secondary line of retreat through Brunn. The Imperial Guard and Bernadotte's I Corps were held in reserve while the V Corps under Lannes guarded the northern sector of the battlefield, where the new communication line was located.

By 1 December 1805, the French troops had been shifted in accordance with the Allied movement southward, as Napoleon expected.

Battle begins

The battle began at about 8 a.m. with the first allied lines attacking the village of Telnitz, which was defended by the 3rd Line Regiment. This sector of the battlefield witnessed heavy fighting in this early action as several ferocious Allied charges evicted the French from the town and forced them onto the other side of the Goldbach. The first men of Davout's corps arrived at this time and threw the Allies out of Telnitz before they too were attacked by hussars and re-abandoned the town. Additional Allied attacks out of Telnitz were checked by French artillery.

Allied columns started pouring against the French right, but not at the desired speed, so the French were mostly successful in curbing the attacks. Actually, the Allied deployments were mistaken and poorly timed: cavalry detachments under Liechtenstein on the Allied left flank had to be placed in the right flank and in the process they ran into, and slowed down, part of the second column of infantry that was advancing towards the French right. At the time, the planners thought this slowing was disastrous, but later on it helped the Allies. Meanwhile, the leading elements of the second column were attacking the village of Sokolnitz, which was defended by the 26th Light Regiment and the Tirailleurs, French skirmishers. Initial Allied assaults proved unsuccessful and General Langeron ordered the bombardment of the village. This deadly barrage forced the French out, and at about the same time, the third column attacked the castle of Sokolnitz. The French, however, counterattacked and regained the village, only to be thrown out again. Conflict in this area ended temporarily when Friant's division (part of III Corps) retook the village. Sokolnitz was perhaps the most contested area in the battlefield and would change hands several times as the day progressed.

While the Allied troops attacked the French right flank, Kutuzov's IV Corps stopped at the Pratzen Heights and stayed still. Just like Napoleon, Kutuzov realized the importance of Pratzen and decided to protect the position. But the young Tsar did not, so he expelled the IV Corps from the Heights. This act quickly pushed the Allied army into its grave.

"One sharp blow and the war is over"

At about 8:45 a.m., satisfied at the weakness in the enemy centre, Napoleon asked Soult how long it would take for his men to reach the Pratzen Heights, to which the Marshal replied, "Less than twenty minutes, sire." About 15 minutes later, Napoleon ordered the attack, adding, "One sharp blow and the war is over."

A dense fog helped to cloud the advance of St. Hilaire's French division, but as they went up the slope the legendary 'Sun of Austerlitz' ripped the mist apart and encouraged them forward. Russian soldiers and commanders on top of the heights were stunned to see so many French troops coming towards them. Allied commanders moved some of the delayed detachments of the fourth column into this bitter struggle. Over an hour of fighting destroyed much of this unit. The other men from the second column, mostly inexperienced Austrians, also participated in the struggle and swung the numbers against one of the best fighting forces in the French army, eventually forcing them to withdraw down the slopes. However, gripped by desperation, St. Hilaire's men struck hard once more and bayoneted the Allies out of the heights. To the north, General Vandamme's division attacked an area called Staré Vinohrady ("Old Vineyards") and, through talented skirmishing and deadly volleys, broke several Allied battalions.

The battle had firmly turned in France's favour, but it was far from over. Napoleon ordered Bernadotte's I Corps to support Vandamme's left and moved his own command center from Žuráň Hill to St. Anthony's Chapel on the Pratzen Heights. The difficult position of the Allies was confirmed by the decision to send in the Russian Imperial Guard; Grand Duke Constantine, Tsar Alexander's brother, commanded the Guard and counterattacked in Vandamme's section of the field, forcing a bloody effort and the only loss of a French standard in the battle (a battalion of the 4th Line Regiment was defeated). Sensing trouble, Napoleon ordered his own heavy Guard cavalry forward. These men pulverized their Russian counterparts, but with both sides pouring in large masses of cavalry, no victory was clear.

The Russians had a numerical advantage but soon the tide swung as Drouet's Division, the 2nd of Bernadotte's I Corps, deployed on the flank of the action and allowed French cavalry to seek refuge behind their lines. The horse artillery of the Guard also inflicted heavy casualties on the Russian cavalry and fusiliers. The Russians broke and many died as they were pursued by the reinvigorated French cavalry for about a quarter of a mile. The casualties of the Russians in Pratzen included Kutuzov, who was severely wounded, and his son-in-law Ferdinand von Tiesenhausen who was killed.

Endgame

Meanwhile, the northernmost part of the battlefield was also witnessing heavy fighting. Prince Liechtenstein's heavy cavalry began to assault Kellerman's lighter cavalry forces after eventually arriving at the correct position in the field. The fighting initially went well for the French, but Kellerman's forces took cover behind General Caffarelli's infantry division once it became clear Russian numbers were too great. Caffarelli's men halted the Russian assaults and permitted Murat to send two cuirassier divisions (one commanded by d'Hautpoul and the other one by Nansouty) into the fray to finish off the Russian cavalry for good. The ensuing mêlée was bitter and long, but the French ultimately prevailed. Lannes then led his V Corps against Bagration's men and after hard fighting managed to drive the skilled Russian commander off the field. He wanted to pursue, but Murat, who was in control of this sector in the battlefield, was against the idea.

Napoleon's focus now shifted towards the southern end of the battlefield where the French and the Allies were still fighting over Sokolnitz and Telnitz. In an effective double-pronged assault, St. Hilaire's division and part of Davout's III Corps smashed through the enemy at Sokolnitz, which persuaded the commanders of the first two columns, Generals Kienmayer and Langeron, to flee as fast as they could. Buxhowden, the commander of the Allied left and the man responsible for leading the attack, was completely drunk and fled as well. Kienmayer covered his withdrawal with the O'Reilly light cavalry, who managed to defeat five of six French cavalry regiments before they too had to retreat.

General panic now seized the Allied army and it abandoned the field in all possible directions. A famous episode occurred during this retreat: Russian forces that had been defeated by the French right withdrew south towards Vienna via the Satschan frozen ponds. French artillery pounded towards the men, and the ice was broken due to the bombardment. The men drowned in the cold ponds, dozens of Russian artillery pieces going down with them. Estimates of how many guns were captured differ: there may have been as few as 38 or more than 100. Sources also differ about casualties, with figures ranging between 200 and 2,000 dead. Many drowning Russians were saved by their victorious foes. However, local evidence, only later made public, suggests that Napoleon's account of the catastrophe may have been totally exaggerated; on his instructions the lakes were drained a few days after the battle and the corpses of only two or three men, with some 150 horses, were found. However, Tsar Alexander I confirmed the incident after the wars.

Military and political results

Allied casualties stood at about 36,000 out of an army of 89,000, which represented about 38% of their effective forces. The French lost around 9,000 out of an army of 66,000, or about 13% of their forces. The Allies also lost some 180 guns and about 50 standards. The great victory was met by sheer amazement and delirium in Paris, where just days earlier the nation had been teetering on the brink of financial collapse. Napoleon wrote to Josephine, "I have beaten the Austro-Russian army commanded by the two emperors. I am a little weary. ... I embrace you." Napoleon's comments in this letter led to the battle's other famous designation, "Battle of the Three Emperors". However, Emperor Francis of Austria was not present at the battlefield. Tsar Alexander perhaps best summed up the harsh times for the Allies by stating, "We are babies in the hands of a giant." After hearing the news of Austerlitz, British Prime Minister William Pitt referred to a map of Europe, "Roll up that map; it will not be wanted these ten years."

France and Austria signed a truce on 4 December and the Treaty of Pressburg 22 days later took the latter out of the war. Austria agreed to recognize French territory captured by the treaties of Campo Formio (1797) and Lunéville (1801), cede land to Bavaria, Württemberg and Baden, which were Napoleon's German allies, pay 40 million francs in war indemnities and cede Venice to the Kingdom of Italy. It was a harsh end for Austria but certainly not a catastrophic peace. The Russian army was allowed to withdraw to home territory and the French ensconced themselves in Southern Germany. The Holy Roman Empire was extinguished, 1806 being seen as its final year. Napoleon created the Confederation of the Rhine, a string of German states meant to serve as a buffer between France and Prussia. Prussia saw these and other moves as an affront to its status as the main power of Central Europe and it went to war with France in 1806.

Rewards

Napoleon's words to his troops after the battle were full of praise: Soldats! Je suis content de vous. The Emperor provided two million golden francs to the higher officers and 200 francs to each soldier, with large pensions for the widows of the fallen. Orphaned children were adopted by Napoleon personally and were allowed to add "Napoleon" to their baptismal and family names. This battle is one of four for which Napoleon never awarded a victory title, the others being Marengo, Jena, and Friedland.

Popular culture

Artists and musicians on the side of France and her conquests expressed their sentiment in populist and elite art of the time. Prussian music critic E. T. A. Hoffmann, in his famous review of Beethoven's 5th Symphony,
singles out for special abuse a certain Bataille des trois Empereurs, a French battle symphony by Louis Jadin celebrating Napoleon's victory at Austerlitz.

Leo Tolstoy memorably dramatized the battle as the conclusion of Book 3 and Volume 1 of War and Peace, making it a crucial moment in the lives of both Andrei Bolkonsky, who is badly wounded, and of Nikolai Rostov.

Archibald Alison in his History of Europe (1836) offers the first recorded telling of the apocryphal story that when the Allies descended the Pratzen Heights to attack Napoleon's supposedly weak flank,
The marshals who surrounded Napoleon saw the advantage, and eagerly besought him to give the signal for action; but he restrained their ardour ... "when the enemy is making a false movement we must take good care not to interrupt him." 

In subsequent accounts, this Napoleonic quote would go through various changes until it became: "Never interrupt your enemy when he is making a mistake."

In his poem "Grass", Carl Sandburg refers to the battle in the line, "Pile the bodies high at Austerlitz and Waterloo".

In the HBO series Succession Connor Roy's character, a Napoleon enthusiast, names his New Mexico ranch "Austerlitz".

The 1960 French film "The Battle of Austerlitz," directed by Abel Gance, tells the story, including the political environment in France, England, and Europe that led up to the battle.

Historical views

Napoleon did not succeed in defeating the Allied army as thoroughly as he wanted, but historians and enthusiasts alike recognize that the original plan provided a significant victory, comparable to other great tactical battles such as Cannae. Some historians suggest that Napoleon was so successful at Austerlitz that he lost touch with reality, and what used to be French foreign policy became a "personal Napoleonic one" after the battle. In French history, Austerlitz is acknowledged as an impressive military victory, and in the 19th century, when fascination with the First Empire was at its height, the battle was revered by the likes of Victor Hugo, who "in the depth of [his] thoughts" was hearing the "noise of the heavy cannon rolling towards Austerlitz". In the 2005 bicentennial, however, controversy erupted when neither French President Jacques Chirac nor Prime Minister Dominique de Villepin attended any functions commemorating the battle. On the other hand, some residents of France's overseas departments protested against what they viewed as the "official commemoration of Napoleon", arguing that Austerlitz should not be celebrated since they believed that Napoleon committed genocide against colonial people.

After the battle, Tsar Alexander I laid all the blame on Kutuzov, the Commander-in-chief of the Allied Army. However, it is clear that Kutuzov's plan was to retreat farther to the rear where the Allied Army had a sharp advantage in logistics. Had the Allied Army retreated further, they might have been reinforced by Archduke Charles's troops from Italy, and the Prussians might have joined the coalition against Napoleon. A French army at the end of its supply lines, in a place which had no food supplies, might have faced a very different ending from the one they achieved at the real battle of Austerlitz.

Monuments and protection of the area

In the years following the battle, many memorials were set up around the affected villages to commemorate both the individual episodes of the battle and the thousands of its victims. Since 1992 the area where the Battle of Austerlitz took place is protected by law as a landscape monument zone. Its value lies in the historical peculiarities of the place, in the historical connections of settlements, landscapes and terrain formations, and in the overall landscape image. The area extends to 19 of today's municipalities:

Blažovice
Holubice
Hostěrádky-Rešov
Jiříkovice
Kobylnice
Křenovice
Podolí
Ponětovice
Prace
Sivice
Šlapanice
Slavkov u Brna
Sokolnice
Telnice
Tvarožná
Újezd u Brna
Velatice
Žatčany
Zbýšov

It was designed and built in the Art Nouveau style by Josef Fanta in 1910–1912. World War I postponed the monument's dedication until 1923. Within is a chapel with an ossuary. A nearby small museum commemorates the battle. Every year, the events of the Battle of Austerlitz are commemorated in a ceremony.

Other memorials located in the monument zone include among others:

The Staré vinohrady height near Zbýšov saw the bloody collision of the French and Russian guards. In 2005, the Monument to the Three Emperors has been erected here.
Stará Pošta ("Old Post") in Kovalovice is an original building from 1785, which now serves as a hotel and restaurant. On 28 November 1805, the French cavalry general Murat set up his headquarters here. On the day of the battle, the Russian general Bagration had his headquarters here. After the battle, Napoleon slept in this house and held preliminary negotiations about an armistice. A small museum commemorates these events.
On  in Tvarožná is a small white chapel. The hill was a mainstay of the French position and allowed the French artillery to dominate the northern portion of the battlefield. Below the hill, the yearly historical reenactments take place.
On Žuráň Hill where Napoleon had his headquarters, a granite monument depicts the battlefield positions.
Slavkov Castle, where an armistice was signed between Austria and France after the battle on 6 December 1805. There is a small historic museum and a multimedia presentation about the battle.

Several monuments to the battle can be found far beyond the battle area. A notable monument is the Pyramid of Austerlitz, built by French soldiers stationed there to commemorate the 1805 campaign near Utrecht in the Netherlands. In Paris, the 44-metre-high bronze Colonne Vendôme, a celebration of Napoleon, also stands on the Place Vendôme. The monument was originally called the Column of Austerlitz and, according to propaganda, was cast from the melted down barrels of Allied guns from the Battle of Austerlitz. A number of other sites and public buildings commemorate the encounter in Paris, such as Pont d'Austerlitz and nearby Gare d'Austerlitz. A scene from the battle is also depicted on the bas-relief of the eastern pillar of the Arc de Triomphe and Arc de Triomphe du Carrousel.

See also
Gare d'Austerlitz
Military career of Napoleon Bonaparte

Explanatory notes

Citations

General references

Castle, Ian. Austerlitz 1805: The Fate of Empires. Oxford: Osprey Publishing, 2002. 
Castle, Ian. Austerlitz: Napoleon and the Eagles of Europe. Pen & Sword Books, 2005. .

Dupuy, Trevor N. (1990). Understanding Defeat: How to Recover from Loss in Battle to Gain Victory in War. Paragon House. .
Farwell, Byron (2001). The Encyclopedia of Nineteenth-century Land Warfare: An Illustrated World View. New York: W. W. Norton and Company. .

Goetz, Robert. 1805: Austerlitz: Napoleon and the Destruction of the Third Coalition (Greenhill Books, 2005). .

Marbot, Jean-Baptiste Antoine Marcelin. "The Battle of Austerlitz," Napoleon: Symbol for an Age, A Brief History with Documents, ed. Rafe Blaufarb (New York: Bedford/St. Martin's, 2008), 122–123.

<

Tolstoy, Leo. War and Peace. London: Penguin Group, 1982.

External links

 Austerlitz order of battle
Austerlitz
 The Battle of Austerlitz 2005
 Austerlitz 2005: la bataille des trois empereurs
 Austerlitz Online Game (Pousse-pion éditions, 2010)
Austerlitz: The Battle of the Three Emperors (Napoleonic Miniatures Wargame Society of Toronto)

 View on battle place – virtual show
Bellum.cz – "Battle of Austerlitz 2nd December 1805"

 
1805 in France
1805 in the Austrian Empire
Austerlitz 1805
Austerlitz 1805
Battles involving France
Austerlitz 1805
Austerlitz 1805
Battles of the War of the Third Coalition
Conflicts in 1805
Czech lands under Habsburg rule
December 1805 events
War of the Third Coalition
Battles inscribed on the Arc de Triomphe
History of the South Moravian Region
Joachim Murat